Somethin' Else is a London and New York content agency, specialising in content strategy and production across video, television, audio and social media. It was founded in 1991 by Jez Nelson, Chris Philips and Sonita Alleyne, and was acquired outright by Sony Music Entertainment in 2021, after a number of joint venture projects between the two, with the company being part of Sony Music's Global Podcast Division.

History
Somethin' Else is a media production company set up in 1991. The company's first production was the Gilles Peterson Show, created for the UK's independent radio network in 1993 and currently broadcast by BBC 6 Music in a Saturday afternoon slot.

It is responsible for producing a number of radio programmes for BBC Radio 1, BBC Radio 1xtra, BBC Radio 2 and 6Music  with The Kitchen Cabinet and Gardeners' Question Time, made for BBC Radio 4 and Kermode and Mayo's Film Review produced for BBC Radio 5 Live for 21 years. It is the BBC's biggest multi-platform supplier, and as well as producing over 35 weekly radio shows for the corporation, it makes television for BBC 4 and iPlayer and creates social media for the BBC's music radio brands. Television projects have included the modern day version of Jazz 625 for BBC Four, a jazz music programme originally broadcast by BBC 2 in the mid 1960s.

In addition to the BBC, other past and present clients of Somethin' Else have include the TOPMAN, The Economist, Channel 4,  Interflora, Swarovski, ITV, Penguin Random House, Red Bull, Boots UK, Porsche, Chivas Regal, FIAT, Nissan, Wrigley, Rolls-Royce and The British Phonographic Industry.

Somethin' Else is involved in the social media production of The BRIT Awards as well as a number of productions for Sky Arts such as Guitar Star, The Ronnie Wood Show and Brian Johnson's A Life on the Road.

In 2017, it was the only company in the UK to feature in Campaign Magazine's School Reports and Broadcast Magazine's Top 100. On 16 June 2021, Sony Music Entertainment announced that the company had acquired Somethin' Else.

On 1 April 2022, the last ever episode of Kermode and Mayo's Film Review was broadcast by the BBC, with Somethin' Else announcing that the  replacement show, called Kermode and Mayo's Take, would be a twice weekly podcast series featuring film and television reviews, with the Take 2 podcast being exclusive to subscribers.

People
Somethin' Else's board is Jez Nelson, Steve Ackerman (MD), Paul Burdin (FD) and Ben Kerr. The chairman is Tom Barnicoat (former COO at Endemol group) and Jon Wilkins (founder of Naked) and Lindsey Clay (CEO Thinkbox) are non-executive directors.

Selected projects

Radio and podcasts
 Kermode and Mayo's Take  expected May 2022 onwards
Kermode and Mayo's Film Review (BBC Radio 5 Live), 2001–22 (produced from 2011)
The Penguin Podcast
BBC Radio 1's Essential Mix (BBC Radio 1), 1993–present
The weekly audio edition of The Economist – In 2014, editor John Micklethwait claimed that German President Angela Merkel listens to the audio edition in her car
Gilles Peterson (BBC Radio 6 Music)
Gardeners' Question Time (BBC Radio 4), 2009–present
The Radio 1 Rock Show (BBC Radio 1)
The Kitchen Cabinet (BBC Radio 4)
Essential Classics (BBC Radio 3)
1914 Day By Day ("BBC Radio 4")
The Selector (NME Radio), 2001–2010
Jazz on 3 (BBC Radio 3)
The Surgery (BBC Radio 1)
Martin Garrix Rocks Blackpool (Combined iPlayer and BBC Radio 1)
Papa Sangre (iOS), 2010
The Nightjar (iOS), 2011
Papa Sangre II
Audio Defence: Zombie Arena
6-0-6 (BBC Radio 5 Live), 2010–2015
The Treehouse – with Danny Baker and Louise Pepper (Podcast)
The Last Post (Podcast) - offshoot of and co-production with The Bugle

Television and Video
Brian Johnson's A Life on the Road (Sky Arts)
Guitar Star (Sky Arts)
The Ronnie Wood Show (Sky Arts)
Topman TV
Online video content for Swarovski, Interflora, Orangina.
Extreme Festivals for BBC Radio 1 on BBC iPlayer
Northern Soul: Living for the Weekend (BBC Four)
Guin and the Dragon (BBC 2)
Between the Lines (BBC Learning)
Ten Pieces (BBC Learning)
Foxy TV for Foxy Bingo

Social Media and digital
Social Media for The BRIT Awards (the most tweeted about TV show of all time)
Social Media for ITV shows including Saturday Night Takeaway, The Voice and Dancing on Ice
Social Media for BBC Radio brands (Radio 1, 1Xtra, Asian Network, Radio 2,  6 Music)
Footballers United
Immersive Oculus Rift experience for the South African Tourist Board

Awards
Somethin' Else has won  Cannes Lions, eight BAFTA awards and multiple Sony Radio Academy Awards. They were awarded Children's Company of the Year award in the 2013 and 2015 Children's BAFTAs. In 2016, the agency also won a Marketing Week award for 'Most Compelling Content' for their game Silverpoint for Absolut Vodka, and a Broadcast Digital Award for Best Social Media Campaign for its work on the BRIT Awards.

References

External links
 – official site

Television production companies of the United Kingdom
Radio production companies
Mobile game companies
2021 mergers and acquisitions